The A. C. Jeffery Farmstead is a historic farmhouse in rural Izard County, Arkansas. It is located at the northern end of County Road 18, north of the hamlet of Mount Olive.

Description and history 
It is a two-story wood frame I-house with a traditional central hall plan, and a kitchen ell extending to the rear (east) of the main block. The front faces west, overlooking the White River, and has a two-story porch extending across the center three bays of the five-bay facade. The interior features woodwork and hardware original to the building's c. 1848 construction. The house was built by Augustus Jeffery, the son of Jehoiada Jeffery, the first permanent white settler in north-central Arkansas, and is one of the oldest houses in the region.

The property was listed on the National Register of Historic Places on August 11, 1994.

See also
Jeffery Cemetery
National Register of Historic Places listings in Izard County, Arkansas

References

Houses on the National Register of Historic Places in Arkansas
Houses completed in 1848
Houses in Izard County, Arkansas
National Register of Historic Places in Izard County, Arkansas
I-houses in Arkansas